Coleophora chretieniella is a moth of the family Coleophoridae. It is found in Tunisia.

Taxonomy
Coleophora chretieniella is the replacement name for Coleophora bipunctella.

References

chretieniella
Endemic fauna of Tunisia
Moths described in 1971
Moths of Africa